This is a population history of the 210 census-designated places in the US state of [[Colorado since the 2000 United States census. The United States Census Bureau defines certain unincorporated communities as census-designated places (CDPs) for enumeration in each decennial census. The Census Bureau defined 85 CDPs in Colorado for the 2000 Census, 187 CDPs for the 2010 Census, and 210 CDPs for the 2020 Census.

At the 2020 United States census, the Highlands Ranch CDP was the most populous CDP in Colorado with 103,444 residents. The Fulford CDP lost both of its residents before the 2020 Census.

The following table will be expanded as additional censuses are taken.


Census-designated places

See also

Colorado
Bibliography of Colorado
Index of Colorado-related articles
Outline of Colorado
Geography of Colorado
History of Colorado
List of counties in Colorado
List of places in Colorado
List of mountain passes in Colorado
List of mountain peaks of Colorado
List of mountain ranges of Colorado
List of populated places in Colorado
List of census-designated places in Colorado
List of county seats in Colorado
List of forts in Colorado
List of ghost towns in Colorado
List of historic places in Colorado
List of municipalities in Colorado
List of populated places in Colorado by county
List of post offices in Colorado
List of rivers of Colorado
List of protected areas of Colorado
List of statistical areas in Colorado

Notes

References

External links

United States Department of Commerce
United States Census Bureau
State of Colorado
History Colorado

Population history of Colorado census-designated places
Lists of places in Colorado
Lists of populated places in Colorado
Colorado census-designated places, Population history of
Colorado census-designated places, Population history of